The 2023 Hula Bowl was a postseason college football all-star game played on January 14, 2023, with kickoff at 12:00 noon EST, at FBC Mortgage Stadium in Orlando, Florida. It was the first all-star contest of the 2022–23 bowl games and, while not restricted to FBS players, one of the final games of the 2022 FBS football season. Television coverage was provided by CBS Sports Network. This was the second playing of the Hula Bowl outside of Hawaii, due to Aloha Stadium near Honolulu being closed for renovations. The game rostered players into Aina and Kai teams, the words for land and sea in the Hawaiian language. Through sponsorship from the Tunnel to Towers Foundation, the game was officially named the 2023 Tunnel to Towers Foundation Hula Bowl.

Players

Selected players are listed below. Full roster are available online (link); note that a number may be shared by an offensive and defensive player.

Two players from Japan participated in the game: Kento Ogushi (CB, Waseda University) and Mikito Itokawa (WR, Kwansei Gakuin University).

Team Aina
Coach: Mike Smith

Team Kai
Coach: Brian Billick

Game summary
Team Kai wore white uniforms and Team Aina wore dark uniforms. The game was played using National Football League (NFL) rules; however, punt returns were not allowed. In place of kickoffs, teams automatically started possessions at their own 25-yard line.

The game was officiated by an all-female crew, assigned by the NFL "from their development pool of college officials." Referee Amanda Sauer had previously served as the center judge in the 2022 Fenway Bowl.

Note: bowl organizers had the three placekickers (Dunn, Podlesny, and Brown) rotate through opportunities to kick during the game, regardless of team affiliations.

See also
 2023 NFL Draft

References

External links
 
 2023 Hula Bowl via YouTube
 Game statistics via statbroadcast.com

Hula Bowl
American football in Florida
Hula Bowl
Hula Bowl
American football in Orlando, Florida